Xenolea collaris is a species of beetle in the family Cerambycidae, and the type species of its genus. It was described by James Thomson in 1864. It is known from Indonesia, Taiwan and the Philippines.

Subspecies
 Xenolea collaris formosana Breuning, 1965
 Xenolea collaris collaris J. Thomson, 1864

References

Lamiinae
Beetles described in 1864